David Thomas Richards (31 October 1906 – 1 October 1969) was a Welsh professional football left half who made over 210 appearances in the Football League for Wolverhampton Wanderers. He also played league football for Birmingham and Brentford and won 21 caps for Wales.

Personal life 
Richards' brother Billy also played in the Football League and was capped by Wales. Richards died in Yardley, Birmingham in 1969, at age 62.

Honours 
Wolverhampton Wanderers
 Football League Second Division: 1931–32

Career statistics

References

1906 births
1969 deaths
Footballers from Merthyr Tydfil
Welsh footballers
Wales international footballers
Association football wing halves
Merthyr Town F.C. players
Wolverhampton Wanderers F.C. players
Brentford F.C. players
Birmingham City F.C. players
Walsall F.C. players
English Football League players